Pyrgospira aenone is a species of sea snail, a marine gastropod mollusk in the family Pseudomelatomidae.

Description
The size of the shell varies between 18 mm and 40 mm.

The yellowish brown shell contains about seven whorls exclusive of the (lost) protoconch. The spire is acute. The whorls are markedly shouldered.  The suture is strongly appressed with a strong cord in front of it. The  anal fasciole is excavated, arcuately striated, with a few obscure fine spiral threads running in it. The axial sculpture consists of (on the body whorl fifteen) short prominent nearly vertical subrectangular ribs rounded above and confined to the peripheral region in front of which on the base of the body whorl are about twice as many thread-like ridges mostly continuous over the base to the beginning of the siphonal canal. The incremental lines are rather marked. The spiral sculpture consists  of three or four threads with wider interspaces overrunning and sometimes slightly nodulating the peripheral ribs. In front of these on the base are about eight spiral threads conspicuously nodulous at the intersections with the minor ridges, and with much wider interspaces. On the younger shells these threads are more close set, fewer and less nodulous, the minor ridges inconspicuous. Finally between these in the adult are more or less distinct finer spiral striae. The siphonal canal is also spirally threaded with a conspicuous siphonal fasciole. The  aperture is rather narrow with a well marked anal sulcus close to the suture, and on the body a prominent subsutural callus. The outer lip is produced, sharp-edged and smooth within. The inner lip is callous. The outer edge of the enamel is slightly raised, and on the siphonal canal prominent with a chink between it and the siphonal fasciole. The siphonal canal is short and  recurved.

Distribution
This species occurs in the Pacific Ocean from Nicaragua to Panama; also off the Galápagos Islands.

References

External links
 Reeve, L. A. (1843-1846). Monograph of the genus Pleurotoma. In: Conchologia Iconica, or, illustrations of the shells of molluscous animals, vol. 1, pl. 1-40 and unpaginated text. L. Reeve & Co., London.
 Melvill, J. C. (1927). Descriptions of eight new species of the family Turridae and of a new species of Mitra. Proceedings of the Malacological Society of London. 17(4): 149–155
 Pilsbry, H. A. & Lowe, H. N. (1932). West Mexican and Central American mollusks collected by H. N. Lowe, 1929–1931. Proceedings of the Academy of Natural Sciences of Philadelphia. 84: 33-144, 17 pls
 
 

aenone
Gastropods described in 1919